Pobeda is a rural locality (a settlement) in Kamennomostskoye Rural Settlement of Maykopsky District, Russia. The population was 152 as of 2018.

References 

Rural localities in Maykopsky District